Lichtspeer is an action video game developed and published by Lichthund. The game was released in September 2016 for Microsoft Windows, macOS, Linux, and PlayStation 4. In 2017, it was released under the title Lichtspeer: Double Speer Edition for PlayStation Vita and Nintendo Switch. The game takes place in a futuristic version of the time of ancient Germanic mythology whereby the player controls a lone warrior that must fight off waves of enemies using a throwable "Lichtspeer" and several "Lichtpowers".

Reception 

Lichtspeer was released to varied reviews from critics with all platforms garnering "mixed or average reviews" according to review aggregator website Metacritic.

References

External links

Action video games
macOS games
Nintendo Switch games
PlayStation 4 games
PlayStation Vita games
Single-player video games
Video games developed in Poland
Windows games
2016 video games